"Big Skies" is a song and debut single by Australian singer songwriter, Morgan Evans, released in September 2007, following his win at the 2007 Telstra Road to Tamworth competition. 

Following his win at the Telstra Road to Tamworth, Evens flew to Nashville where he recorded his debut single and performed on an international artists showcase. "Big Skies" speaks number 1 on The Country Music Channel Chart and the Australian Country Radio Charts and peaked at number 28 on the ARIA Physical Singles Charts.

Track listing

Charts

References

2007 singles
Morgan Evans (singer) songs
Sony Music Australia singles
2007 songs